The Doors: Original Soundtrack Recording is the soundtrack to Oliver Stone's 1991 film The Doors. It contains several studio recordings by the Doors, as well as the Velvet Underground's "Heroin" and the introduction to Carl Orff's Carmina Burana. None of Val Kilmer's performances of the Doors' songs that are featured in the movie are included in the soundtrack.

Cover
The cover for the album is of Jim Morrison as portrayed by Val Kilmer. It is a photo of Kilmer looking straight in the camera's lens. His face is in black and white and his hair has the color of burning flames, it is the same effect created on the movie's posters and advertising material.

The French release of the soundtrack features Jim Morrison walking in a hallway towards the viewer; he's also portrayed by Kilmer, and the photograph was also part of the advertising material especially in France.

Track listing
All songs are performed by The Doors and written by Jim Morrison, Robby Krieger, Ray Manzarek, and John Densmore, except where noted.

Personnel
The Doors:
Jim Morrison – vocals
Robby Krieger – guitar
Ray Manzarek – piano and organ
John Densmore – drums
Note: Played on all tracks except tracks 9 & 10
Paul A. Rothchild – producer of all tracks except for tracks 2, 9, 10 & 14
Bruce Botnick – co-producer of the L.A. Woman tracks; engineer for all tracks except tracks 9 & 10
Budd Carr – executive producer
Oliver Stone – album director
The Velvet Underground:
Lou Reed - lead guitar, lead vocals
John Cale - electric viola
Sterling Morrison - rhythm guitar
Maureen Tucker - percussion
Note: The personnel for track 10
Jerry Scheff – bass guitar on tracks 2, 7 & 14
Douglass Lubahn – bass guitar on track 3
 Larry Knechtel (uncredited) – bass guitar on track 6

Certifications

References

1991 compilation albums
1991 soundtrack albums
Albums produced by Paul A. Rothchild
Elektra Records compilation albums
Elektra Records soundtracks
Biographical film soundtracks
The Doors compilation albums
The Doors soundtracks